Miriam Ziegler (born 19 March 1994) is a retired Austrian pair skater. With her skating partner, Severin Kiefer, she is a seven-time Austrian national champion (2014–16, 2018, 2020–22) and represented Austria at the 2014, 2018 and 2022 Winter Olympics. As a singles skater, she is a two-time Austrian national champion (2009, 2010) and competed at the 2010 Winter Olympics.

Programs

With Kiefer

Single skating

Results 
GP: Grand Prix; CS: Challenger Series; JGP: Junior Grand Prix

Pair skating with Kiefer

Single skating

References 

 Results Austrian Nationals 2010 https://web.archive.org/web/20110710174721/http://staatsmeisterschaften2010.ekl-austria.com/oem/CAT001RS.HTM

External links 

 
 
 Tracings.net profile
 Figure Skating Online profile

1994 births
Austrian female single skaters
Austrian female pair skaters
Living people
Figure skaters at the 2010 Winter Olympics
Figure skaters at the 2014 Winter Olympics
Figure skaters at the 2018 Winter Olympics
Figure skaters at the 2022 Winter Olympics
Olympic figure skaters of Austria
People from Oberpullendorf District
Sportspeople from Burgenland
Competitors at the 2013 Winter Universiade
21st-century Austrian women